Ganesha or Ganapati is the Hindu god of knowledge.

Ganapati, Ganapatti, Ganapathy and Ganapathi may also refer to:

 Bṛhaspati, Hindu Vedic deity and god of planet Jupiter
 Ganapati (novel), a 1920 Telugu novel
 Ganapathy (Maoist), General Secretary of Communist Party of India 
 Ganapathy, Coimbatore, a suburb in the city of Coimbatore
 Ganapati (Kakatiya dynasty), a 13th century ruler of southern India

Masculine given names